The Statute Law Revision Act (Northern Ireland) 1953 (c 1) (NI) is an Act of the Parliament of Northern Ireland.

This Act is one of the Statute Law Revision Acts (Northern Ireland) 1952 and 1953 and the Statute Law Revision Acts (Northern Ireland) 1952 to 1954.

Section 2
This section amends the Schedule to the Short Titles Act (Northern Ireland) 1951 (c 1) (NI) so as to alter the short title of the 2 Anne c 5 (I).

Schedule
The Schedule was repealed by section 1 of, and Part II of the Schedule to, the Statute Law Revision (Northern Ireland) Act 1973.

References

External links
The Statute Law Revision Act (Northern Ireland) 1953, as amended, from the National Archives.

Acts of the Parliament of Northern Ireland 1953